Jeff Kintu, better known by his stage name Lyrical G, is a Ugandan rapper, songwriter, record producer, and vocalist. In 2016, he was named among MTV Base's best hip hop artistes from Uganda.

Lyrical G has won a number of accolades including the Lifetime Achievement Award at the 4th edition of the MTN UG Hiphop Awards 2020, also winning 4 Pearl of Africa Music (PAM) Awards including Best Hiphop Artiste Of The Year (2005 & 2006) PAM awards.

Early life and education
Lyrical G was born on 8 March 1978. He went to Nakasero Primary School and Budo Junior School for his primary education. He proceeded to St Charles Lwanga SS Kasasa and Katikamu SDA for his secondary education. He later enrolled in Nkumba University where he graduated,having majored in Business Studies.

Music
Lyrical G started his rap career in the 1990s in his high school, performing at various music concerts. He released his first single "Ato’oba" with his former group Bataka Underground in March 1999 and that same year the group then released their second single "Ssesetula", which was launched on Power FM. He performed with Bataka Underground until he, together with young brother AKay47 and friends formed Urban Thugz (which later became Urban Life) in 2000. He recorded his first single ‘Nothing Compares’ with Urban Life in 2001 after they won a recording deal for being the best upcoming group at the Sanyu FM music Carnival. ‘Nothing Compares’ was released in Feb 2002 on Sanyu FM.

In mid 2002, he pursued a solo career  Lyrical G has worked with South African rapper Proverb, T.I.D from Tanzania, the UK's Mas Law, Typical Fefe & Tyonne from Barbados and Outrageous Records in South Africa.

He has released a record 9 studio albums, "Live From East Africa" released in 2004, "Narudi" in 2006, "First and Flow Most" in 2007, "Tha GMC Project" released in 2009, "Simple & Plain", 2010,"1st & Flow Most 2:Back 2 Basics"(2012),"Grown Man Talk", 2013 ,"Feel Good Music", 2014 and "Geezy",2019. He has also featured on compilations such as UG Hip Hop Allstars (2005), the Walter Reed Project collaboration album (2006) and End Of The Weak Compilation(2014). He is also the voice behind the theme rap song for tv show The Honourablez.

Discography
Albums:
Live From East Africa, 2004
Narudi, 2006
1st & Flow Most, 2007
Tha GMC Project, 2009
Simple & Plain, 2010
1st & Flow Most II, Back 2 Basics,2012
Grown Man Talk, 2013
Feel Good Music, 2014
Geezy, 2019
OG, 2023

Featured on:
K2 by Klear Kut,2002
Fever by Steve Jean,2003
First Love Album,2003
Nod Your Head by Obsessions,2004
The UG Allstar Compilation,2005
The Walter Reed Project Allstar Album,2006
End Of The Weak Allstar Album,2014

Singles:
At'oba (w/ Bataka Underground),1999
Ssesetula (w/ Bataka Underground),1999
Ain't No Good (w/ Steve Jean) 2003
East Africa Party, 2003
Raw Steez, 2004
Tha Roof (w/ Steve Jean), 2004
Need 2 Know (w/ Obsessions), 2004
Welcome 2 Kampala (w/ Ngoni, Michael Ross, Benon & Vamposs, Saba Saba, Chagga, Papito),2005
Friday (w/ Dorothy), 2005
Narudi, 2005
Mother Africa (w/ Hiphop Allstarz), 2005
Hey U, 2006
Brand New Day (w/ Hiphop Allstarz),2006
Art Of War (w/ Babaluku),2007
Kazanyo (w/ Rocky Giant), 2007
Back At It Again, 2008
Songa, 2009
Complicated, 2009
So Fly, 2010
Kyana Kiwala, 2010
Kla City, 2010
All I C (w/ Mun G), 2012
Twist Dat Spit (w/ Hardcore Prince), 2012
Think About It, 2012
Daddy Loves U, 2013
Get Ya Hustle On (w/ St Nelly-sade), 2013
Hey Gal, 2013
Babiri, 2014
Feel Good Music, 2014
Extra Love (w/ Foever & Nemesis),2014
UG Cypher 2 (w/ Navio, 3 Card, Nelly- sade, Ninja-C, Ruyonga, Mith, Bigtril, Mun G, Tucker HD, Flex D'Paper), 2015
Gangsta (w/ Deejay Crim & T-Bro), 2018
Never Gon Change (w/ Judas Rapknowledge), 2018
Float, 2018
Tha Life (Kubaala) (w/ Unique), 2019
Atamukutte, 2019
Tuli Majje (w/ Oki Foever, Ossie Entrance, Eazy Tex, B-Money & 207), 2019
Keep It Lit, 2019
Been Bout My Thang (w/ GNL Zamba), 2020
Twebaza, 2020
Brother's Keeper (w/A Few Good Friends),2020
Never Knew Pain
Put Domestic Violence On Lockdown(w/Code 9),2020
Thank You Father (w/Julius Sese),2021
The Honorables Theme Song,2022
Sikyasaaga, 2022
With It With It (w/Stone Age UG), 2022
Kika (w/Tryton Muzik), 2022

Awards and recognition

MTN UG Hiphop Awards Lyricist Of The Year 2022 MTN Uganda Hip Hop Awards 2022 All The Winners

MTN UG Hiphop Lifetime Achievement Award Winner 2020 MTN UG Hip Hop Awards 2020: All the winners
Pearl of Africa Music(PAM) Awards Best Hip Hop Single 2005(Mother Africa ft UG Hiphop Allstars) 2005 Winners & Nominees
Pearl of Africa Music(PAM) Awards Best Hip Hop Artiste 2005 2006 Winners & Nominees
Pearl of Africa Music(PAM) Awards Best Hip Hop Artiste 2006 2006 Winners
Pearl of Africa Music(PAM) Awards Best Hip Hop Single 2006(Hey U ft Pinky 2006 Winners
Nominations:
Pearl Of Africa Music Hip hop Artiste Of The Year Nominee: 2004,2005,2006 & 2007
Pearl Of Africa Music Hip Hop Single Of The Year Nomination:East Africa Party(2004), Narudi(2005), Mother Africa ft The Uganda Hiphop Allstars(2005), Hey U(2006), Brand New Day ft The Uganda Hiphop Allstars(2006), Art Of War(2007)
Buzz Awards Top Hood Rapper of The Year Nominee:2007 & 2008
MTN UG Hiphop Awards 2019 Video Of The Year: Gangsta w/Dj Crim & T-Bro
MTN UG Hiphop Awards 2022  Lyricist Of The Year, Inspirational Song Of The Year: Never Knew Pain.

References

External links 
 Facebook
 YouTube
 Reverbnation

Ugandan rappers
1978 births
Living people
Kumusha